Joseph W. Alton Jr. (January 18, 1919 – March 29, 2013) was an American politician and a Republican.

Early life
Joseph Walter Alton Jr. was born in Annapolis, Maryland on January 18, 1919, to Joseph W. Alton, the county sheriff. He graduated from Annapolis High School.

Career
Alton served as Deputy Sheriff of Anne Arundel County from 1947 to 1951. After his father's death in 1950, Alton became the next Sheriff of Anne Arundel County. He served as sheriff from 1950 to 1962. He represented Anne Arundel County as a State Senator from 1963 to February 1, 1965.

Alton then served as the first County Executive of Anne Arundel County, Maryland from February 1, 1965, to 1974.

In December 1974, Alton pleaded guilty in U.S. District Court to charges of conspiracy to commit extortion for attempting to get $36,000 in kickbacks from consultants. He was sentenced to eighteen months in federal prison, of which he served seven months at Allenwood Federal Prison Camp, in Allenwood, Pennsylvania. He was paroled in September 1975.

Personal life
Alton married and divorced three times. He had two children: Joseph W. Alton III and Marsha J. Alton.

Death
Alton died on March 29, 2013, at Genesis Eldercare Spa Creek Center in Annapolis, two days after his son, Joseph W. Alton III.

References

External links
 Alton Biography from the Maryland Archives

1919 births
2013 deaths
Politicians from Annapolis, Maryland
Republican Party Maryland state senators
Maryland sheriffs
Anne Arundel County Executives
Maryland politicians convicted of crimes